Matt Hoyle is an American photographer based in New York City. He is most known for publishing Comic Genius: Portraits of Funny People, a book which features photos of famous celebrities like Steve Martin, Tina Fey, Mel Brooks and Carol Burnett. His work has been exhibited at the National Portrait Gallery, London.

Hoyle was named as one of the 50 greatest street photographers right now by Complex Magazine in 2012. He lived in Los Angeles and Australia before he moved to New York City in 2007.

Career 
Hoyle's work has received many industry awards including D&AD, PDN Photo Annual & Photographer of the Year at the Masters Cup Color Awards. He’s been selected as one of the 200 Best Ad Photographers by Lürzer's Archive, and has appeared multiple times in the IPA Best of Show. Hoyle's work has also won a Cannes Gold Lion.

Hoyle was a speaker at TEDXDubai in 2012, where he spoke about finding "perfection in imperfection." Hoyle's fine art photography has been exhibited in London, New York, Dubai and Sydney.

Comic Genius 
In October 2013, Hoyle Published Comic Genius: Portraits of Funny People. The book includes over 130 pictures of celebrities and comedians. Mel Brooks wrote the introduction of the book. Comic Genius received favourable reviews. The Huffington Post called it "an epic new compendium of hilarious photographs." Digital Journal wrote than the book shows "us the truly hilarious sides of funny celebs from Steve Martin to Conan O'Brien to Tina Fey to John Cleese" and PetaPixel wrote that "as coffee table photo books go, there is nothing like it." Hoyle also directed and launched two videos alongside Comic Genius, featuring Steve Martin and Neil Patrick Harris. In one video Steve Martin is locked in a banjo duel with Kermit the Frog. In another short video, Neil Patrick Harris stars as a Buster Keaton-esque character longing for his distant love.

Philanthropy 
Hoyle announced that he would donate all net proceeds from Comic Genius to Save the Children. After publishing the book, he teamed up with Gavel&Grand to publicly auction off framed and autographed prints from the celebrities in Comic Genius and gave all proceeds to the Save the Children charity.

References

External links 
Comic Genius

Australian photographers
Living people
American photographers
Year of birth missing (living people)